Stephen Stuart Solomon Conway (born February 1948) is a British property developer, the founder, chairman and CEO of Galliard Homes, London's largest privately owned residential property developer.

Early life
Conway was born and grew up in Bow, London.

Career
Conway trained as a banker, before shifting to property in the 1980s and starting a company that was later acquired by Frogmore, for whom he then worked until he and John Black founded Galliard Homes in 1992.

In 2015, he had an estimated net worth of £270 million.

Personal life
He lives with his wife Hilary Conway in Marylebone, London.

His son David Conway (born 1976) is a director of Galliard Homes.

References

1948 births
Living people
People from Bow, London